Rimsky-Korsakov is a 1953 Soviet biopic directed by Gennadi Kazansky and Grigori Roshal and starring Grigori Belov, Nikolai Cherkasov and Aleksandr Borisov. The film portrays the life of the Russian composer Nikolai Rimsky-Korsakov. The film was shot in Sovcolor.

Cast
 Grigori Belov as Nikolai Rimsky-Korsakov  
 Nikolai Cherkasov as Vladimir Stasov  
 Aleksandr Borisov as Savva Mamontov 
 Liliya Gritsenko as Nadezhda Zabela-Vrubel
 Viktor Khokhryakov as Alexander Glazunov
 Anatoliy Kuznetsov as Anatoly Lyadov
 Lidiya Sukharevskaya as Rimskaya-Korsakova  
 Aleksandr Ognivtsev as Feodor Chaliapin
 Boris Kokovkin as Valentin Serov  
 Sergei Kurilov as Mikhail Vrubel
 Lidiya Dranovskaya as Almazova 
 Anatoli Verbitsky as Mikhailov 
 Tatyana Lennikova as Lebedeva  
 Agasi Babayan as Daryan 
 Bruno Freindlich as Ramensky  
 Vladimir Balashov as Sergei Diaghilev
 Fyodor Nikitin as The Grand Duke 
 Yevgeni Lebedev as Kashchey in Kashchey the Deathless opera

See also
 Sadko is a film also from 1953 that adapts Rimsky-Korsakov's opera.

References

Bibliography
 Mitchell, Charles P.  The Great Composers Portrayed on Film, 1913 Through 2002. McFarland & Company, 2004.

External links

1950s biographical drama films
Soviet biographical drama films
Russian biographical drama films
Films about classical music and musicians
Films about composers
1950s Russian-language films
Films directed by Grigori Roshal
Films directed by Gennadi Kazansky
Films set in the 19th century
Nikolai Rimsky-Korsakov
Films scored by Georgy Sviridov